This is a list of previously missing aircraft that disappeared in flight for reasons that were initially never definitely determined. The status of "previously missing" is a grey area, as there is a lack of sourcing on both the amount of debris that needs to be recovered, as well as the amount of time it takes after the crash for the aircraft to be recovered while searching, to fit this definition. According to Annex 13 of the International Civil Aviation Organization, an aircraft is considered to be missing "when the official search has been terminated and the wreckage has not been located", but this does not go into defining found aircraft. The following entries are aircraft that gained widespread acclaim for once being missing.

Legend

List of aircraft

See also
 List of missing aircraft, for aircraft that have never been recovered

References

 
Dis
Dis